Paine Lake is a lake in Hubbard County, in the U.S. state of Minnesota.

Paine Lake was named for Barrett Channing Paine, a Minnesota explorer.

See also
List of lakes in Minnesota

References

Lakes of Minnesota
Lakes of Hubbard County, Minnesota